"Bed" is a song by English DJ Joel Corry, English singer Raye and French DJ David Guetta. It was released as a single on 26 February 2021, through Perfect Havoc and Asylum Records UK. The song was written by Corry, Raye, Guetta, Giorgio Tuinfort, Jin Jin, Lewis Thompson and Neave Applebaum. The song was certified platinum by the BPI on 23 July 2021.

Background
In an interview with the Official Charts Company, Corry explained that the creation of the song started in summer 2020 during a studio session with singer-songwriter Janée "Jin Jin" Bennett. After listening to demos recorded by Raye, he proceeded to contact the singer via Instagram, saying "she told me that she wrote the idea with David Guetta. I got in contact with David and he was happy for me to work on it with Raye. Me and Raye hit the studio together and developed the rest of the song. Fast forward eight months and we are ready to release 'Bed' to the world". Prior to the release, Corry revealed, "I've put so much hard work and love into it and I'm so lucky to be able to collaborate with amazing talents like Raye and the legend, David Guetta. I'm just so excited for the world to hear it." The single was announced on 18 February 2021, with each artist posting a picture of themselves lying in bed.

Composition
"Bed" was described as a "piano house" track with a "punchy and upbeat drop". The song sees Raye commanding "attention, delivering the track's flirtatious yet defiant lyrics with a sophistication and sass that only she can".

Critical reception
In her review for Billboard, Krystal Rodriguez wrote, "Catchy and entirely relatable, 'Bed' has summer 2021 written all over it." Ben Beaumont-Thomas of The Guardian found it "no less of an earworm" than Corry's previous single "Head & Heart". He described it as "softer, with gorgeous cosmic-disco detailing" and "a climactic drop that lands with devastating sweetness on the offbeat."

Live performances
Corry, Raye and Guetta performed "Bed" on Ant & Dec's Saturday Night Takeaway on 3 April 2021.

Track listing
Digital download and streaming
 "Bed" – 2:58

Digital download and streaming – Joel Corry VIP Mix
 "Bed" (Joel Corry VIP Mix) – 2:59

Digital download and streaming – The Bedtime Mixes
 "Bed" (Acoustic) – 2:57
 "Bed" (Chilled Mix) – 3:12

Digital download and streaming – David Guetta Festival Mix
 "Bed" (David Guetta Festival Mix) – 3:55

Digital download and streaming – The Remixes Pt.2
 "Bed" (Oliver Nelson Remix) – 3:23
 "Bed" (Roberto Surace Remix) – 3:57
 "Bed" (That Kind Remix) – 2:41
 "Bed" (Kream Remix) – 2:50
 "Bed" (The Stickmen Remix) – 3:13
 "Bed" (Chloe Wilson Remix) – 3:20

Digital download and streaming – The Remixes Pt.1
 "Bed" (WADE Remix) – 3:09
 "Bed" (Chapter & Verse Remix) – 3:39
 "Bed" (Kream Remix) – 2:50

Personnel
Credits adapted from Tidal.

 Joel Corry – production, programming
 Raye – lead vocals, backing vocals
 David Guetta – production, programming
 Giorgio Tuinfort – production
 Lewis Thompson – production, engineering, programming
 Neave Applebaum – production, engineering, programming
 Nonô – backing vocals
 Jenna Felsenthal – engineering, vocal production
 Kevin Grainger – mastering, mixing
 Cameron Gower Poole – vocal production

Charts

Weekly charts

Year-end charts

Certifications

References

2021 singles
2021 songs
Asylum Records singles
Joel Corry songs
Number-one singles in Russia
Song recordings produced by David Guetta
Songs written by David Guetta
Songs written by Giorgio Tuinfort
Songs written by Raye (singer)
Raye (singer) songs
David Guetta songs
House music songs
Songs written by Jin Jin (musician)